The Need for Speed video game series is published by Electronic Arts. Games in the series were primarily developed by Canadian developer EA Canada from 1992 to 2001. They were later primarily developed by Canadian developer EA Black Box for a period of the series' history from 2002 to 2011. After a stint with several game developers (including British developer Criterion Games) from 2009 through 2012, the series is currently being handled by Swedish-British developer Ghost Games, whose debut title Need for Speed Rivals was released in 2013.

The series debuted with The Need for Speed in North America, Japan (under the Over Drivin' title through High Stakes), and Europe in 1997. Need for Speed is a series of racing video games where the main objective is to win races in a variety of game modes, in the process eluding traffic and police. Aftermarket customization of video game vehicles was an aspect first introduced by the Need for Speed series after the release of the film, The Fast and the Furious; the feature was included in every Need for Speed title developed by EA Black Box from Need for Speed: Underground through Need for Speed: Undercover.

The NFS series is among the best-selling video game franchises with 100 million copies sold. Electronic Arts considers one of the reasons the series has remained so popular is because "the series has long been an ever-evolving franchise, one that changes up its focus, mechanics and style every couple of years".

Primary installments

Other games

See also
 Need for Speed
 Electronic Arts
 Ghost Games

References

External links
Official website
Ghost Games official website 

Need for Speed